Francesca Cauz (born 24 September 1992) is an Italian racing cyclist, who last rode for UCI Women's Team .

References

External links
 

1992 births
Living people
Italian female cyclists
People from Conegliano
Cyclists from the Province of Treviso